Johnstone v Bloomsbury Health Authority [1992] QB 333 is an English contract law case, concerning implied terms and unfair terms under the Unfair Contract Terms Act 1977.

Facts
Dr Chris Johnstone was a junior doctor in the Obstetric Department at the University College Hospital. According to para 4(b) of his contract, he was expected to be available on call for 48 hours a week on average, on top of his 40-hour contract. His first claim was that it was a breach of the duty of care to have a contract which could cause foreseeable injury. His alternative claim was that the clause allowing him to be so long on call was contrary to the Unfair Contract Terms Act 1977 section 2(1).

Stephen Sedley QC represented Dr Johnstone.

Judgment
The Court of Appeal held that Bloomsbury Health Authority had to pay damages for the harm to Dr Johnstone's health, and by a majority based this decision on the common law, but for different reasons.

Stuart-Smith LJ held that an implied term in law can prevail over an express term. He set out that there was a Duty A to be available for 48 hours, on top of 40 hours and a Duty B on the authority to not injure the employee's health. The Authority had the power to make the employee work 88 hours a week on average. "But that power had to be exercised in the light of the other contractual terms and in particular their duty to take care for his safety". As Lord Thankerton said in Wilsons and Clyde Coal Ltd v English [1938] AC 57, 67, "when a workman contracts to do work, he is not to be held as having agreed to hold the master immune from the latter’s liability for want of due care in the provision of a reasonably safe system of working". He also held that UCTA 1977 s 2(1) would invalidate an 88-hour working week. He concluded saying that Bloomsbury Health Authority could only succeed if it showed the clause was an express assumption, or volenti, but then it would still fall under UCTA 1977 through s 1(1). He finished by saying that it was a matter of "grave public concern" and Parliament should do something.

Leggatt LJ, dissenting on the common law point of implied terms, would have held, that tort cannot trump contract, as counsel Mr Beloff put it. However he did say that para 4(b) could be void under UCTA 1977.

Browne-Wilkinson VC said the implied term would circumscribe the scope of the express term, so that both coexist without conflict. When exercising its discretion about how long Dr Johnstone should work for, it would have to do so subject to its duty to not injure him. He stated the following.

See also

English contract law
Unfair Contract Terms Act 1977
Unfair Contract Terms Bill
Interpreting contracts in English law
Mahmud and Malik v Bank of Credit and Commerce International SA [1998] AC 20

Notes

References
Fender v Mildmay [1938] AC 1, Lord Atkin notes that categories of contract against public policy should be done only warily.
E McGaughey, A Casebook on Labour Law (Hart 2019) ch 4, 178

English contract case law
Court of Appeal (England and Wales) cases
United Kingdom employment contract case law
1991 in case law
1991 in British law